Laetilia fiskella is a species of snout moth in the genus Laetilia. It was described by Harrison Gray Dyar Jr. in 1904. It is found in eastern North America, including Florida, Maryland, South Carolina, Tennessee and West Virginia.

References

Moths described in 1904
Phycitini